Castanets are a percussion instrument.

Castanet may also refer to:

Places in France
 Castanet, Aveyron
 Castanet, Tarn
 Castanet, Tarn-et-Garonne
 Castanet-le-Haut, Hérault, France
 Castanet-Tolosan, Haute-Garonne, France

People
 André Castanet (fl. 1900), French Olympic competitor in athletics
 Bernard de Castanet (c. 1240–1317), French bishop of the Roman Catholic Archdiocese of Albi

Other
 Castanet (film), a 1945 Spanish drama film
 Castanets (band)
 Château de Castanet, Lozère, France
 Castanet, a fictional island the player resides on in the video game Harvest Moon: Animal Parade